{|

{{Infobox ship career
|Hide header=
|Ship country=United States
|Ship flag=
|Ship name=Burleigh
|Ship namesake=A county in south central North Dakota. The state capital, Bismarck, is located within its boundaries.
|Ship owner=
|Ship operator=
|Ship registry=
|Ship route=
|Ship ordered=
|Ship awarded=
|Ship builder=Ingalls Shipbuilding
|Ship original cost=
|Ship yard number=
|Ship way number=
|Ship laid down=6 July 1943
|Ship launched=3 December 1943
|Ship sponsor=Mrs. Dallas H. Smith
|Ship christened=Sea Adder
|Ship completed=
|Ship acquired=
|Ship commissioned=30 October 1944
|Ship recommissioned=
|Ship decommissioned=11 June 1946
|Ship maiden voyage= 
|Ship in service=
|Ship out of service=
|Ship renamed=
|Ship reclassified=
|Ship refit=
|Ship struck=
|Ship reinstated=
|Ship homeport=
|Ship identification=
|Ship motto=
|Ship nickname=
|Ship honours=
|Ship honors=Two battle stars for service in World War II.
|Ship captured=
|Ship fate=Scrapped May 1973
|Ship notes=MC Hull No. 862
|Ship badge=
}}

|}

USS Burleigh (APA-95) was a  that served with the United States Navy from 1944 to 1946. She was sold into commercial service in 1947 and was scrapped in 1973.

HistoryBurleigh (named after Burleigh County, North Dakota), was launched on 3 December 1943 by Ingalls Shipbuilding, Pascagoula, Mississippi under a Maritime Commission contract, and placed in reduced commission on 1 April 1944.  She was taken to New York, and placed out of commission on 13 April for conversion by Bethlehem Steel, 56th Street Yard, Brooklyn, New York.  The ship was placed in full commission on 30 October 1944.

Pacific War
On 3 December 1944 Burleigh departed Hampton Roads, Virginia, and proceeded to the Pacific, arriving at Pearl Harbor on 23 December.  She became flagship of Transport Squadron 18 at San Francisco on 3 January 1945.  During January and February, Burleigh transported passengers and supplies to Pearl Harbor, Guadalcanal, and the Russell Islands.

March 1945 was spent at Ulithi, Caroline Islands, in preparation for the assault on Okinawa.  Burleigh departed Ulithi, in company with Transport Squadron 18, on 27 March, and arrived off Okinawa on 1 April.  She remained in the area disembarking Marines and supplies until 10 April, when she got underway for Pearl Harbor.  She arrived at Pearl Harbor on 27 April, after stopping at Guam to embark casualties.

Returning to San Francisco on 4 June, Burleigh embarked troops and supplies and steamed to Guam via Pearl Harbor, Eniwetok, and Saipan.  She returned to San Francisco on 2 August.

Operation Magic Carpet
With the cessation of hostilities, Burleigh was assigned to the Operation Magic Carpet fleet returning veterans from the Pacific until March 1946.

Decommissioning and fate
On 15 March 1946 she departed the West Coast for Norfolk, Virginia, where she arrived in April.  She was decommissioned on 11 June 1946 and returned to the Maritime Commission the following day. On 26 June 1947, she was sold to the Matson Navigation Company and was renamed SS Hawaiian Pilot. She was again sold on 8 May 1961 to Oceanic Steamship Company, a Matson subsidiary, and was renamed SS Sonoma . On 21 January 1971, the ship was sold to Far East Line Inc. and finally on 17 March 1972 to Excelsior Marine Corporation and she was renamed SS Noma''. She was sold for scrap in 1973.

Awards
Burleigh received one battle star for her World War II service.

References
 
 APA-95 Burleigh, Navsource Online
 Burleigh, Hazegray.org

 

Bayfield-class attack transports
Ships built in Pascagoula, Mississippi
1943 ships
World War II amphibious warfare vessels of the United States
Burleigh County, North Dakota